Nila may refer to:

 Nila, alternate name of Nileh Safid, a village in Iran
 Baby Nila, Leela’s little sister on Sesame Street
 Nila River or Bharathapuzha, is a river in the Indian state of Kerala
 Pulau Nila, a small Indonesian volcanic island in the Banda Sea, and the volcano Mount Nila on it
 Nila Moeloek (born 1949), 20th Minister of Health of Indonesia
 Nila (Ramayana), a monkey from the Hindu epic Ramayana
 Nila Håkedal (born 1979), Norwegian female beach volleyball player
 Meera Chopra (aka Nila), South Indian actress
 Nila (1994 film), a Tamil film released in 1994
 Nila (TV series), a Tamil serial in Sun TV released in 2019
 Nila, character from Shimmer and Shine

See also
 Neela (disambiguation)
 Nilla, a brand of cookies